Christopher Jerell Redd (born March 25, 1985) is an American stand-up comedian, actor, writer, rapper, and singer. After several years performing stand-up comedy, Redd was hired to join the cast of the NBC sketch comedy series Saturday Night Live ahead of the show's 43rd season in 2017, making his debut alongside Heidi Gardner and Luke Null, and serving as a cast member for five seasons until 2022. For his work on the show, he won a Primetime Emmy Award for Outstanding Original Music and Lyrics in 2018 for co-writing the SNL song "Come Back Barack". He is also known for his roles in Popstar: Never Stop Never Stopping (2016), Disjointed (2017–2018), and Kenan (2021–2022).

Early life 
Redd was born on March 25, 1985, in St. Louis, Missouri, and moved to Naperville, a suburb of Chicago, at the age of eight.  According to Redd, he had a childhood stutter that he overcame by learning how to rap. He attended Naperville schools, including Gregory Middle School and Neuqua Valley High School, and later attended community college in Elgin, Illinois, where he took his first improvisational theater class.

Career
Redd briefly pursued a career as a rapper, but switched to sketch comedy after realizing that he enjoyed improvisational comedy. He took comedy classes at Jokes & Notes, a now-closed comedy club in Chicago. Redd joined the comedy group The Second City, and was a member of its touring company. He moved to Los Angeles in 2016 to further pursue an acting career, and made his film debut as Hunter the Hungry, an underground rapper, in the 2016 mockumentary Popstar: Never Stop Never Stopping. Redd co-starred in the 2017–2018 Netflix comedy series Disjointed, in which he played the role of Dank, a stoner.

After a previous unsuccessful audition for Saturday Night Live, it was announced in September 2017 that Redd had joined the show's cast as a featured player for season 43, alongside fellow newcomers Heidi Gardner and Luke Null. In 2018, Redd won a Primetime Emmy Award for Outstanding Original Music and Lyrics for writing the song "Come Back Barack", which lamented former president Barack Obama's departure from the White House and aired during Chance the Rapper's episode on November 18, 2017. The award was shared with co-writers Kenan Thompson and Will Stephen, and composer Eli Brueggemann. Redd and Gardner were promoted to repertory status in 2019, ahead of SNLs 45th season. His celebrity impressions on the show included U.S. Senator Cory Booker, Kanye West, Sterling K. Brown, and Mayor Eric Adams. Redd left SNL in 2022, after the show's 47th season.

Redd's debut stand-up comedy album, But Here We Are, was released by Comedy Central Records in March 2019. Between 2021 and 2022, Redd co-starred in the comedy television series Kenan, alongside his SNL castmate Kenan Thompson. Their ongoing roles in both shows resulted in frequent travel between New York City, where SNL is filmed, and Los Angeles, where Kenan was filmed. Redd is slated to appear in the upcoming film Spinning Gold as Frankie Crocker, a disc jockey for the first black music radio station in New York. Other recent projects include the Lorne Michaels–produced comedy series Bust Down, in which Redd plays a discontented casino employee, and a stand-up comedy special on HBO Max.

Personal life
In October 2022, Redd was assaulted by an unknown assailant outside of a comedy club in New York. He was then taken to the hospital, and later released.

Other activities
In June 2020, Redd and fellow The Second City alumna Lisa Beasley raised over $360,000 on GoFundMe to cover the medical costs of racial justice protestors who had contracted COVID-19. After Second City CEO Andrew Alexander resigned during the same month over allegations of institutional racism within the group, Redd and 18 other black alumni and current employees signed an open letter calling for an independent investigation into the allegations.

Filmography

Film

Television

Discography

References

External links
 
 

1985 births
21st-century American comedians
21st-century American male actors
African-American male actors
African-American male comedians
American male comedians
American impressionists (entertainers)
American male film actors
American male television actors
American male voice actors
American sketch comedians
American stand-up comedians
Comedians from Illinois
Comedians from Missouri
Living people
Male actors from Naperville, Illinois
Male actors from St. Louis
Primetime Emmy Award winners
21st-century African-American people
20th-century African-American people